Zaporizhzhya Titanium-Magnesium Plant is the only manufacturer of titanium sponge in Europe. ZTMP (or ZTMK) is located in Zaporizhzhya, Ukraine, and the plant produces titanium ingots, as well as slabs that are widely used as a structural material in nuclear power, chemical engineering, shipbuilding, and many other industries.

See also 
List of countries by titanium production
Titanium Sponge Plant in India

References 

Companies established in 1935
Steel companies of Ukraine
Companies based in Zaporizhzhia Oblast
Heavy industry
Mining
Metallurgy
Metals
Titanium
Magnesium